Return of Django is a studio album by the Upsetters, released in 1969. The title is a reference to the 1966 Spaghetti Western Django.

Track listing

References

The Upsetters albums
1969 albums
Trojan Records albums
Albums produced by Lee "Scratch" Perry